Qaleh-ye Sheykh (also Romanized as Qal‘eh-ye Sheykh) is a village in Azna Rural District, in the Central District of Khorramabad County, Lorestan Province, Iran. At the 2006 census, its population was 83, in 18 families.

References 

Towns and villages in Khorramabad County